Boost Mobile is an Australian mobile virtual network operator which offers wireless services on the Telstra network.

Boost also provides refurbished devices through Alegre, which are sold online and at supermarket chain Coles.

History
It was founded by Peter Adderton in Sydney, Australia in 2000. Optus began licensing the Boost Mobile brand that same year. Boost Mobile SIMs (or plan 'Starter Kits'), are sold nationwide at over 9000 retail chain locations and independent stores, and select telecom stores can validate a customer's ID to sign up for a plan.

In 2012, Optus ended its business relationship with Boost. In October, Boost announced a deal to resell access to the Telstra network, with Telstra reportedly "looking to chase the youth market". After 20 January 2013, all existing Boost customers were converted to Optus customers and continued to receive services on the Optus network. On 7 March, Boost Tel began to offer products and services under the Boost Pre-paid Mobile brand as an MVNO hosted on the Telstra Next G network. It is the only Telstra MVNO with access to the full Telstra mobile network across regional/rural Australia, the largest network by land area and population coverage in the country.

From 2 February 2021, Boost transitioned to a simplified set of 'Boost Mobile Prepaid' plans offered to new customers, phasing out the former plans in favour of a new pricing scheme, altered inclusions and a new app, which requires a 'Boost ID' account. Boost is gradually migrating existing users to the new plans automatically. From 4 April 2023, Telstra 5G network access is included as standard on Boost Mobile plans. However, download speeds are limited to 150 Mbit/s for most plans.

Marketing 
Boost has consistently marketed itself through sponsorship and promotion of sporting events, and lifestyle-oriented marketing primarily through social media. The company has continued to target its brand and products at younger demographics; "Since Boost Mobile began in August 2000, we’ve been focussed on keeping Aussie youth connected."

In 2018, Boost Mobile formed a partnership with the American-based Stadium Super Trucks to grow the series' presence in Australia. The following year, after the series and the Confederation of Australian Motor Sport reached a three-year commercial rights agreement, the series was branded the Boost Mobile Super Trucks for Australian races.

In 2019, Boost Mobile was the naming-rights sponsor of Garry Rogers Motorsport in the Australian Supercars Championship. In 2020 and 2021, Boost Mobile sponsored James Courtney in a Tickford Racing Ford Mustang. In 2021 it also sponsored Brodie Kostecki in an Erebus Motorsport Holden Commodore ZB.

In 2022, Boost Mobile will become the naming-rights sponsor of both Erebus Motorsport Commodores.

Marketing criticism 
In June 2010, Boost Mobile launched a viral marketing campaign that purported to identify text messaging disorders in order to bring attention to Boost Mobile's offer of 100 texts for one dollar. Australian television programme Media Watch criticized both the campaign itself and certain Australian media outlets that had failed to uncover the underlying marketing campaign, reporting the disorders as straight news. The Age was one of the few publications to recognise that the campaign was a "ruse ... to get the company's name mentioned in the media." As part of the campaign Boost Mobile cited an academic paper co-authored by Dr. Shari Walsh of the Queensland University of Technology. However, Dr. Walsh stated that her paper did not identify any texting disorders and that Boost Mobile was not accurately representing her research.

References

External links 
 

Telecommunications companies established in 2000
Retail companies established in 2000
Australian companies established in 2000
Mobile phone companies of Australia
Mobile virtual network operators
Companies based in Sydney